Robert K. Young was a Scottish professional footballer who made over 160 Football League appearances for Bristol City before and after the First World War as a right back.

References

1886 births
Footballers from Fife
Scottish footballers
Association football fullbacks
English Football League players
Bristol City F.C. players
Dundee Violet F.C. players
Scottish Junior Football Association players
Year of death missing

Scotland junior international footballers